Storytellers is a television music series produced by the VH1 network.

In each episode, artists perform in front of a (mostly small and intimate) live audience, and tell stories about their music, writing experiences and memories, somewhat similar to MTV Unplugged. The show started in 1996 with a broadcast of Ray Davies, during his "Storyteller" tour, and took its name from this first show.

As of February 2016, 98 episodes have aired, and many of the performances have subsequently been released on CD or DVD. "Best of" collections have also been released.

Performers

VH1 Storytellers

Meat Loaf enjoyed the show so much that he bought the stage decorations from VH-1 and went on to do a "Storytellers" tour in 1998/1999.

MTV Japan Storytellers

References

External links
 VH1 Storytellers -- dead link

 
1990s American music television series
2000s American music television series
2010s American music television series
1996 American television series debuts
Rock music television series
VH1 music shows